Stanley J. Orzel is an American film director and screenwriter based in Los Angeles and Hong Kong, best known for directing "Four Assassins"and Lost for Words.  Orzel served as Creative Consultant on "HERO", "House of Flying Daggers", both directed by (Zhang Yimou).

Filmography

References

External links
 

 
 
 
 

American film directors
Hong Kong film directors
Living people
Year of birth missing (living people)
S.I. Newhouse School of Public Communications alumni
People from Binghamton, New York